Timothy Richard Goebel (born September 10, 1980) is an American former competitive figure skater. He is the 2002 Olympic bronze medalist. He was the first person to land a quadruple salchow jump in competition and the first person to land three quadruple jumps in one program. He landed 76 career quadruple jumps before his retirement in 2006.

Personal life
Goebel was born on September 10, 1980, in Evanston, Illinois. He was adopted through Catholic Charities by Ginny and Richard Goebel as an infant.

Goebel initially attended Loyola Marymount University. Beginning in the fall of 2006, he studied at Columbia University's School of General Studies, graduating in May 2010 with a bachelor's degree in mathematics. After working for the Nielsen ratings company, he joined an ad agency, MEC, as a consumer analyst. As of April 2016, he was pursuing a master's degree in data science from New York University Stern School of Business. In January 2017, he began working as a data analyst for Google.

In April 2016, Goebel became engaged to his boyfriend of three years, Thomas Luciano. They married on April 29, 2017, in Newport, Rhode Island.

Career 
Early in his career, Goebel was coached by Carol Heiss Jenkins and Glyn Watts near his Illinois home and then moved to California to work with Frank Carroll.

During his skating career and prior to the arrival of Nathan Chen to the sport, Goebel was sometimes referred to as the "Quad King" because of his ability to land quadruple jumps. On March 7, 1998, in Lausanne, Switzerland, at the Junior Grand Prix Final, Goebel became the first skater in the world to land a quadruple Salchow, and the first American skater to land a quadruple jump of any kind in competition. International Skating Union officials ratified the jump at the end of the month after watching a video provided by the parents of Tiffany Stiegler / Johnnie Stiegler.

On October 31, 1999, at the 1999 Skate America in Colorado Springs, Goebel became the first skater to land three quads in one program. In the free skate, he landed a quad salchow in combination, a quad toe loop, and a quad salchow as a solo jump.

Goebel also made history at the 2002 Olympics by becoming the first skater to successfully land a quad salchow jump in combination in Olympic competition. Goebel's repertoire of quadruple jumps made him one of the most competitive skaters in the world during the peak of his career. He would land a total of 76 quads in competition. Goebel was heavily criticized early in his career for focusing exclusively on jumping to the detriment of choreography and presentation, but in later years he improved in those areas.

Goebel increasingly struggled with his jumps after 2003 due to injuries. At the 2006 U.S. Championships, in what he had previously announced would be his last competitive season, he was unable to land either a quadruple jump or triple Axel cleanly, and dropped to a seventh-place finish which left him far short of qualifying for the 2006 Winter Olympics.

Goebel represented the Winterhurst Figure Skating Club. He was coached by Audrey Weisiger in Fairfax, Virginia, after having been previously coached by Carol Heiss Jenkins, Glyn Watts and Frank Carroll.

On April 25, 2006, Goebel announced his retirement from competitive skating. He planned to continue to contribute to the sport as a technical specialist, having received certification for competitions sanctioned by the United States Figure Skating Association. He worked as a technical specialist at the Aviator Figure Skating Academy in New York.

He attended Columbia University, graduating in 2010 with a degree in mathematics. In 2016, he received a Master of Science in Business Analytics degree from New York University Stern School of Business, and currently works for Google as a Marketing Mix Modeling Partner Program Manager.

Programs

Competitive highlights
GP = Grand Prix; JGP = Junior Series (Junior Grand Prix)

References

External links

 
 Timothy Goebel at the U.S. Olympic Committee

American male single skaters
Figure skaters at the 2002 Winter Olympics
Olympic bronze medalists for the United States in figure skating
Sportspeople from Evanston, Illinois
1980 births
Living people
American adoptees
Olympic medalists in figure skating
World Figure Skating Championships medalists
World Junior Figure Skating Championships medalists
Medalists at the 2002 Winter Olympics
Gay sportsmen
LGBT figure skaters
American LGBT sportspeople
LGBT people from Illinois
Columbia University School of General Studies alumni